Gabriël Çulhacı (born 30 December 1999) is a Dutch professional footballer who plays as a left-back for Eerste Divisie club Helmond Sport.

Club career

Utrecht
Çulhacı started his youth career with the academy of AVV Zeeburgia and later moved to the academy of FC Utrecht in 2012. On 30 December 2017, he signed his first professional contract with the club, penning a deal till the mid of 2020. On 17 August 2018, he made his debut for Jong FC Utrecht in a 5–0 defeat against Go Ahead Eagles. In the 2019–20 season, he sat on the bench for the first team for two games, but he did not play yet. 

For the season 2020–21 he was loaned out to NEC Nijmegen. This loan period was prematurely ended on 28 January 2021.

Helmond Sport
On 21 April 2022, Çulhacı signed a two-year contract with Helmond Sport, with an option for an additional year. He made his Helmond debut on 23 September in a 2–0 away loss at Erve Asito to Heracles Almelo, coming on in the 62nd minute in place of Gaétan Bosiers.

International career

On 21 March 2017, Çulhacı was called to under-18 national team as a replacement for Tyrell Malacia for a friendly match against Austria.

Style of play
Jordy Zuidam, the football director of FC Utrecht has described Çulhacı as a "fast, agile defender with a healthy urge forward". Zuidam also said that Çulhacı knows "how to combine his defensive qualities with his attacking drive".

Career statistics

References

External links

OnsOranje profile

1999 births
Living people
Association football defenders
Dutch footballers
Netherlands youth international footballers
Jong FC Utrecht players
FC Utrecht players
NEC Nijmegen players
Helmond Sport players
Eerste Divisie players
Dutch people of Turkish descent